James Irvine (born 2 December 1948) is a retired field hockey defender from Australia, who was a member of the national team that won the silver medal at the 1976 Summer Olympics in Montreal, Quebec, Canada.  He was also a member of the team that finished fourth at the 1984 Summer Olympics in Los Angeles.

Irvine was born in Sydney, New South Wales. After his career he became a hockey coach. Irvine was the assistant of head coach Terry Walsh with the Men's National Team at the 2000 Summer Olympics, where The Kookaburras finished third. Later on he went to the Netherlands, where he coached Amsterdam for three seasons (2001–2004) and won the Dutch title twice.

References

External links
 

1948 births
Living people
Australian male field hockey players
Australian field hockey coaches
Olympic field hockey players of Australia
Field hockey players at the 1976 Summer Olympics
Field hockey players at the 1984 Summer Olympics
Olympic silver medalists for Australia
Sportspeople from Sydney
Olympic medalists in field hockey
Medalists at the 1976 Summer Olympics
Male field hockey defenders
Australian expatriate sportspeople in the Netherlands
Expatriate field hockey players
Sportsmen from New South Wales
Field hockey people from New South Wales